Gungmangbong may refer to:

 Gungmangbong (Chungcheongbuk-do), a mountain in South Korea
 Gungmangbong (Gyeonggi), a mountain in South Korea